Etudes is an album by the American jazz bassist Charlie Haden recorded in 1987 and released on the Italian Soul Note label.

Reception
The Allmusic review by Scott Yanow awarded the album 4½ stars, stating, "The communication between these three masterful players is quite impressive".

Track listing
All compositions by Charlie Haden except as indicated
 "Lonely Woman" (Ornette Coleman) - 9:55 
 "Dolphy's Dance" (Geri Allen) - 4:00 
 "Sandino" - 4:43 
 "Fiasco" (Paul Motian) - 5:38 
 "Etude II" (Motian) - 2:07 
 "Blues in Motian" - 6:59 
 "Silence" - 6:36 
 "Shuffle Montgomery" (Herbie Nichols) - 6:24 
 "Etude I" (Motian) - 2:12 
Recorded at Sound Ideas Studios in New York City on September 14 & 15, 1987

Personnel
Charlie Haden – bass
Geri Allen - piano
Paul Motian - percussion

References 

Black Saint/Soul Note albums
Charlie Haden albums
1988 albums